Amblyscirtes reversa, the reversed roadside skipper, is a butterfly of the family Hesperiidae. The species was first described by Frank Morton Jones in 1926. It has a scattered distribution from south-eastern Virginia, south to northern Georgia. It is also found in southern Mississippi and southern Illinois.

The wingspan is 29–35 mm. Adults are on wing from April to August. There are two to three generations per year.

The larvae feed on Arundinaria tecta. Adults feed on flower nectar.

References

External links
 Note: This source appears to use the wrong first initial of the author.
Original description: Jones, Frank Morton (July 1926). "The Rediscovery of Hesperia bulenta Bdl.-Lec., with Notes on other Species (Lepid. Hesperiidae)".  Entomological News. 37 (7).

Hesperiinae
Butterflies described in 1926